Wrestling is a low profile individual sport in Australia that Wrestling Australia is the national governing body of the sport, which organise competitions, and the national and Olympic team duties. In Australia the recognised wrestling styles include freestyle, Greco-Roman, beach and indigenous (Coreeda). Wrestling competitions and associations exist in the Australian Capital Territory, New South Wales, Queensland, South Australia, Tasmania, Victoria and Western Australia.

Three Australians have won medals in freestyle events at the Summer Olympics. In Los Angeles in 1932, Eddie Scarf was third in the light-heavyweight division. Sixteen years later in London, Dick Garrard won a silver medal as a welterweight and Jim Armstrong won a bronze medal in the heavyweight division. Garrard is the only wrestler to be inducted into the Sport Australia Hall of Fame. Australia has never won a Greco-Roman Olympic medal.

Divisions
Amateur and Freestyle wrestling in Australia is held in the current divisions.

Freestyle
Men
55 kg
60 kg
66 kg
74 kg
84 kg
96 kg
120 kg

Women
 44–48 kg
 48 – 53 kg
53–55 kg
 55 –59 kg
59– 63 kg
 63 – 67 kg
67– 72 kg

Greco-Roman

Men

See also

 Wrestling Australia
 Amateur wrestling

References

External links
 Australian Olympic Committee
 Commonwealth Games Australia
 United World Wrestling
 Wrestling Australia

Australia
Wrestling in Australia